Killerton is an 18th-century house in Broadclyst, Exeter, Devon, England, which, with its hillside garden and estate, has been owned by the National Trust since 1944 and is open to the public. The National Trust displays the house as a comfortable home. On display in the house is a collection of 18th- to 20th-century costumes, originally known as the Paulise de Bush collection, shown in period rooms.

The estate covers some 2590 hectares (25.9 km2, 6400 acres). Included in the estate is a steep wooded hillside with the remains of an Iron Age hill fort on top of it, known as Dolbury, which has also yielded evidence of Roman occupation, thought to be a possible fort or marching camp within the hill fort.

Killerton House itself and the Bear's Hut summerhouse in the grounds are Grade II* listed buildings. The gardens are Grade II* listed in the National Register of Historic Parks and Gardens.

History

The manor of Columbjohn in the parish of Broadclyst was purchased by Sir John Acland, MP and High Sheriff of Devon. Shortly afterwards, in 1612, the adjoining estate of Killerton was purchased by his nephew Sir Arthur Acland of Acland in the parish of Landkey. The present Georgian Killerton House was built by the 7th baronet, Sir Thomas Dyke Acland, in 1778. The chapel was built in 1738 to the designs of Charles Robert Cockerell.

The garden was created in the 1770s by John Veitch, one of the leading landscape designers of the time. It features rhododendrons, magnolias, herbaceous borders and rare trees, as well as an ice house and early 19th-century summer house. The surrounding parkland and woods offer a number of circular walks. Plans attributed to William Sawrey Gilpin (1762-1843) for a new drive from Killerton to Columbjohn (1820) were not implemented; a short play about of the meeting between Veitch and Gilpin was commissioned by The National Trust in the gardens of Killerton in mid 2016.

Killerton was given to the National Trust by British politician Sir Richard Dyke Acland, 15th Baronet in 1944, and in September 2015 the National Trust commissioned a short drama to be staged on the site entitled The Gift, written by Eileen Dillon, telling the story of Sir Richard's decision to hand over his estate.

The lost house
In 2016 an archaeological dig discovered what is believed to be a footprint of an intended replacement home to the current Killerton. Reports believe that this is what has been known in history as the lost house of Devon, of 240 years, designed by architect James Wyatt. It is within the grounds a shortish walk from the current site, and its existence was obscured by a copse that looks to have been deliberately planted to hide it.

The National Trust has placed woodwork in the four corners of what is believed would have been the corners of the intended property. They have also placed a door and frame on what they believe would have been the entrance to the intended billiard room. Killerton's information boards on the site state that there is an intention for further archaeological digs in the future.

References

External links
Killerton information at the National Trust

Wikidata list of paintings on show at Killerton House

Hill forts in Devon
Roman fortifications in Devon
Gardens in Devon
Country houses in Devon
Grade II* listed buildings in Devon
Grade II* listed parks and gardens in Devon
National Trust properties in Devon
Veitch Nurseries
Museums in Exeter
Historic house museums in Devon
Fashion museums in the United Kingdom
Grade II* listed houses
Roman fortified camps in England